Body and Soul is an album by jazz saxophonist Archie Shepp recorded in Rome, Italy, on September 28 and October 16, 1975, and released on the Horo Records label.

Track listing
 "Body and Soul"
 "Tropical"
 "Dogon"
Recorded in Rome, Italy, on September 28 (tracks 2 & 3), and October 16 (track 1), 1975

Personnel
Archie Shepp - tenor saxophone, soprano saxophone, piano
Charles Greenlee - trombone
Alessio Urso - bass (tracks 1 & 2)
Afonso Vieira - drums (tracks 1 & 2)
Cicci Santucci - trumpet (tracks 1 & 2)
Irio De Paula - guitar (tracks 1 & 2)
Dave Burrell - piano (track 3)
David Williams - bass (track 3)
Beaver Harris - drums (track 3)

References

1975 albums
Archie Shepp albums
Horo Records albums